This article is about the particular significance of the year 1950 to Wales and its people.

Incumbents

Archbishop of Wales – John Morgan, Bishop of Llandaff
Archdruid of the National Eisteddfod of Wales
Wil Ifan (outgoing)
Cynan (incoming)

Events
23 February – 1950 United Kingdom general election: For the first time ever, the Labour Party contests all Parliamentary seats in Wales. Following the election, Wales has 27 Labour MPs, 4 Liberals, 3 Conservatives and one National Liberal/Conservative.
The University of Wales seat is abolished at the dissolution, W. J. Gruffydd having been the last holder.
Roderic Bowen is re-elected for Cardiganshire, with the largest Liberal majority in the country.
David Ormsby-Gore, the future Lord Harlech, becomes MP for Oswestry.
Lynn Ungoed-Thomas, following the abolition of his Llandaff and Barry constituency, is elected MP for Leicester North East.
Roy Jenkins, whose Southwark seat has been abolished, is elected for Birmingham Stechford.
Elwyn Jones becomes MP for West Ham South.
Following the election, Ness Edwards becomes Postmaster-General. During his time in the office, he introduces the greetings telegram.
Abertillery's Labour MP, George Daggar, dies on 14 October, to be replaced by Llywelyn Williams.
12 March – Llandow air disaster: 80 of the 83 people on board an Avro Tudor V aircraft are killed when it crashes on approach to Llandow in Glamorgan, making it the world's worst air disaster at this time.
30 March – William Havard is elected Bishop of St David's.
1 June – The Welsh Air Service, the world's first scheduled helicopter service, begins operating between Cardiff, Wrexham and Liverpool.
27 August – Six people are killed in a rail collision at Penmaenmawr railway station.
9 September – In Swansea, following heavy rain, three houses collapse, killing seven people.
Ysgol Syr Thomas Jones opens in Amlwch on Anglesey as Britain's first purpose-built comprehensive school.
Maes Hyfryd and Bryn Teg housing estates at Beaumaris, designed by Colwyn Foulkes, are built.
Glanllyn is acquired as a permanent site for meetings of Urdd Gobaith Cymru.
In the Honours lists
Physicist Ezer Griffiths is awarded the O.B.E.
Agriculturist Thomas James Jenkin is awarded the C.B.E.
Industrialist Herbert Henry Merrett is knighted.
Margaret Haig Thomas, Viscountess Rhondda, becomes President of University College, Cardiff.

Arts and literature
21 February – Dylan Thomas arrives in the United States, his first visit to America.
The first Welsh Drama Festival is held.
American photojournalist W. Eugene Smith visits the UK to take photographs of working-class life; three of those published are of the South Wales valleys.

Awards
National Eisteddfod of Wales (held in Caerphilly) (first "all-Welsh" Eisteddfod)
National Eisteddfod of Wales: Chair – Gwilym Tilsley
National Eisteddfod of Wales: Crown – Euros Bowen
National Eisteddfod of Wales: Prose Medal – withheld

New books

English language
Sir Leonard Twiston Davies – Welsh furniture: an introduction
Kathleen Freeman – Greek City States
Llywelyn Wyn Griffith – The Welsh
Elisabeth Inglis-Jones – Peacocks in Paradise
Thomas Jones (T. J.) – Welsh Broth
Richard Llewellyn – A Few Flowers for Shiner
V. E. Nash-Williams – The Early Christian Monuments of Wales
Harold Henry Rowley – The Growth of the Old Testament
Bertrand Russell – Unpopular Essays
Raymond Williams – Reading and Criticism

Welsh language
Ambrose Bebb – Machlud yr Oesoedd Canol
Aneirin Talfan Davies – Blodeugerdd o englynion
Edward Morgan Humphreys – Gwŷr enwog gynt
Edgar Phillips – Caniadau Trefîn
Arthur Wade-Evans – Coll Prydain
David Pryse Williams – Canmlwyddiant Libanus ... braslun o'r hanes
William Crwys Williams – Pedair Pennod

Music
Harry Parr Davies – Dear Miss Phoebe (musical)
Arwel Hughes – Dewi Sant (Saint David) (oratorio)
Grace Williams – Three Traditional Ballads
W. S. Gwynn Williams – Breuddwyd Glyndwr

Film
Glyn Houston makes his film debut in The Blue Lamp, which also stars Meredith Edwards and guest stars Tessie O'Shea.
Ray Milland stars in Copper Canyon and A Woman of Distinction.

Sports
Boxing
13 September – Eddie Thomas beats Cliff Curvis at St Helens to become British welterweight champion.
Football
27 October – Wales international Trevor Ford becomes the most expensive footballer in British history after joining Sunderland for £30,000.
Rugby union – Wales win their fourth Grand Slam.
Bowls – The Welsh Ladies Indoor Bowling Association is founded.

Births
23 January – John Greaves, Welsh bass player and songwriter 
7 February – Dai Havard MP, politician
16 February (in Nairobi) – Peter Hain MP, politician
11 March – Terry Cooper, footballer
18 March – Lorraine Barrett AM, politician
27 March – Terry Yorath, footballer and football manager
3 May – Mary Hopkin, singer
5 May (in Saint Kitts) – Pat Thomas, boxer
24 May – Geoff Ellis, cricketer
26 May – Myron Wyn Evans, chemist (died 2019)
2 June – Jonathan Evans MEP, businessman and politician
14 June – Rowan Williams, Archbishop of Canterbury
25 August (in Dublin) – Brian Gibbons AM, politician
8 September – Martyn Woodroffe, swimmer
10 September – Tich Gwilym, guitarist (d. 2005)
11 October – Robert Pugh, actor
16 November – Chris O'Brien, rugby league player
28 November – Meic Povey, screenwriter, playwright and actor (d. 2017) 
8 December – Stephen Richards, judge
10 December – John Parsons, footballer

Deaths
23 January – Jack Rhapps, dual-code international rugby player, 73
13 February – Rees Howells, missionary and founder of the Bible College at Swansea, 70
28 February – David Lewis Prosser, Archbishop of Wales, 81
9 March – Timothy Evans, wrongly executed for murder, 35
15 March – Sir Wilfrid Lewis, judge
12 April – Joe Rees, rugby union player, 56
29 April – Wallace Watts, Wales international rugby union player, 80
15 May – David Edwardes Davies, Bishop of Bangor, 70
21 June – General Sir Henry ap Rhys Pryce, officer in the Indian Army, 75
23 June – Joseph Harry, minister and poet, 86
29 June – H. A. Gwynne, author and newspaper editor, 84
2 July – Henry Haydn Jones MP, politician, 86
5 July – John Hughes, footballer, 73
30 August – Morgan Morgan-Owen, footballer, 73
30 August – Ralph Hancock, landscape gardener, 57
19 September – David Jones, archdeacon of Carmarthen, 75
14 October – George Daggar MP, politician, 71
28 October – Alis Mallt Williams, novelist, 83
21 November – Hugh Emyr Davies, poet, 72

See also
1950 in Northern Ireland

References

 
Wales